The 1901–02 Irish Cup was the 22nd edition of the premier knock-out cup competition in Irish football. 

Linfield won the tournament for the 7th time, defeating Distillery 5–1 in the final.

Results

First round

|}

Replay

|}

Quarter-finals

|}

1 A replay was ordered after a protest.

Replay

|}

Semi-finals

|}

Final

References

External links
 Northern Ireland Cup Finals. Rec.Sport.Soccer Statistics Foundation (RSSSF)

Irish Cup seasons
1901–02 domestic association football cups
1901–02 in Irish association football